Parliamentary elections were held in the People's Republic of Albania on 6 October 1974.
The Democratic Front was the only party able to contest the elections, and subsequently won all 250 seats. Voter turnout was reported to be 100%, with all registered voters voting.

Results

References

Parliamentary elections in Albania
Albania
1974 in Albania
One-party elections
Single-candidate elections
Albania